The 1848 United States presidential election in Florida took place on November 7, 1848, as part of the 1848 United States presidential election. Voters chose three representatives, or electors to the Electoral College, who voted for President and Vice President. This was the first time Florida participated in a U.S. presidential election since its admission into the Union on March 3, 1845.

Florida voted for the Whig candidate, Zachary Taylor, over Democratic candidate Lewis Cass. Taylor won Florida by a margin of 14.40%.

Results

See also 

 1848 United States House of Representatives election in Florida
 1848 Florida gubernatorial election

References

Florida
1848
1848 Florida elections